Qarahjah Veran, also rendered as Qarahchah Veran or Qarehchah Veran or Qarah Chahveran, may refer to:
 Qarahjah Veran-e Olya
 Qarahjah Veran-e Sofla